Maulana Azad Minorities Financial Development Corporation Limited is the state agency of Government of Maharashtra set up in 2000 to  meet the financial requirements of and to provide loans to the minority communities.

Schemes

References

 http://www.mamfdc.org

State agencies of Maharashtra
Minorities-focussed government initiatives in India